Leeds was an electoral riding in Ontario, Canada. It was created in 1886 from Leeds South and Leeds North and Grenville North ridings and was abolished in 1986 before the 1987 election.

Members of Provincial Parliament

References

Former provincial electoral districts of Ontario